Jacob "Jake" Joy is a retired American soccer midfielder who played professionally in the USISL.

Youth
In 1994, Joy graduated from Plano Senior High School.  In 1993, Joy and his teammates won the Texas High School soccer championship.  He was the 1994 Dallas Area Player of the Year.  Joy attended Midwestern State University, playing on the men's soccer team from 1994 to 1996.  In 1995, the Mustangs fell to Lindsey Wilson College in the final of the NAIA national men's soccer championship.  Joy was a 1995 and 1996 NAIA First Team All American.  He was also a 1995 NSCAA Third Team All American.  Joy is a member of the Midwestern State Mustangs Hall of Fame.

Professional
On February 2, 1997, the Kansas City Wizards selected Joy in the third round (twenty-seventh overall) of the 1997 MLS College Draft.  The Wizards released Joy in May and he signed with the Albuquerque Geckos of the USISL D-3 Pro League.  That season, the Geckos won the league title and moved up the USISL A-League for the 1998 season.  In 1999, he finished his career with the Dallas Toros.

References

Living people
American soccer players
Albuquerque Geckos players
DFW Tornados players
Orlando Sundogs players
A-League (1995–2004) players
USL Second Division players
Sporting Kansas City draft picks
Midwestern State University alumni
Association football midfielders
Year of birth missing (living people)